The 1974–75 Minnesota North Stars season was the North Stars' eighth season.

Coached by Jack Gordon (11–22–5) and Charlie Burns (12–28–2), the team compiled a record of 23–50–7 for 53 points, finishing the regular season 4th in the Smythe Division, and failed to qualify for the playoffs.

Offseason

Regular season

Final standings

Schedule and results

Playoffs

Player statistics

Awards and records

Transactions

Draft picks
Minnesota's draft picks at the 1974 NHL amateur draft held in Montreal, Quebec.

Farm teams

See also
1974–75 NHL season

References

External links

Minnesota North Stars seasons
Minnesota North Stars
Minnesota North Stars
Minnesota North Stars
Minnesota North Stars